Cemil Aghamaliyev, Turkish spelling Cemil Ağamaliyev, (born 31 August 1974) is an Azerbaijani chess Grandmaster, now resident of Turkey.

He played for Azerbaijan in the World Youth U26 Team Chess Championship of 1993. In 2005, he finished fifth in the 2nd Kish GM tournament in Iran.

In 2014 he transferred to Turkey, where he now spells his name as Cemil Aghamaliyev.
His handle on the Internet Chess Club is "Sheki".

References

External links
 
 

1974 births
Living people
Chess grandmasters
Azerbaijani chess players
Azerbaijani emigrants to Turkey
Turkish chess players